Uppsala RFC is a Swedish rugby club in Uppsala. The club was founded in 1965 and were national champions in 1969, 1970 and 1977. The women's team were national runners-up in 2005, 2007, 2009 and 2011.

External links
Uppsala RFC

References

Swedish rugby union teams